Glantwymyn is a community in the northwest (Montgomeryshire) of Powys, Wales.

Description
It comprises the villages of Cemmaes, Commins Coch and Cemmaes Road (Welsh name Glantwymyn), as well as the smaller settlements of Abercegir, Dorowen, Esgairgeiliog and Llanwrin.

The community had a population of 1,185 as of the 2011 UK Census, including 200 children under 16, in 527 households. 653 of the population were born in Wales.

Governance
Glantwymyn has a community council which has 15 community councillors and is responsible for local matters including cemeteries and bus shelters. Councillors are elected from the community wards of Ceinws, Cemmaes, Darowen and Llanwrin.

Glantwymyn is also the name of the electoral ward which elects a councillor to Powys County Council. The ward also includes the neighbouring community of Cadfarch.

References

 
Communities in Powys